Semir Kerla (born 26 September 1987) is a Bosnian professional footballer who plays as a centre-back for Cyprus First Division club Doxa Katokopias.

International career
He made his debut for Bosnia and Herzegovina in a December 2010 friendly match against Poland in which he played the first half only. It remained his sole international appearance.

Honours
Željezničar
Bosnian Premier League: 2009–10, 2011–12, 2012–13
Bosnian Cup: 2011–12

Žalgiris
A Lyga: 2014, 2015
Lithuanian Cup: 2014–15 

Sūduva
A Lyga: 2017, 2018, 2019
Lithuanian Cup: 2019
Lithuanian Supercup: 2018, 2019

References

External links

Semir Kerla at Sofascore

1987 births
Living people
Footballers from Sarajevo
Association football central defenders
Bosnia and Herzegovina footballers
Bosnia and Herzegovina international footballers
FK Radnik Hadžići players 
FK Željezničar Sarajevo players
Panserraikos F.C. players
MŠK Žilina players
FK Žalgiris players
FC Irtysh Pavlodar players
FK Sūduva Marijampolė players
Premier League of Bosnia and Herzegovina players 
Super League Greece players 
Slovak Super Liga players
A Lyga players
Kazakhstan Premier League players
Bosnia and Herzegovina expatriate footballers 
Expatriate footballers in Greece
Expatriate footballers in Slovakia
Expatriate footballers in Lithuania
Expatriate footballers in Kazakhstan
Bosnia and Herzegovina expatriate sportspeople in Greece
Bosnia and Herzegovina expatriate sportspeople in Slovakia
Bosnia and Herzegovina expatriate sportspeople in Lithuania
Bosnia and Herzegovina expatriate sportspeople in Kazakhstan